Geridixis is a monotypic moth genus in the subfamily Arctiinae. Its single species, Geridixis minx, is found in Panama. Both the genus and species were first described by Harrison Gray Dyar Jr. in 1914.

References

Lithosiini